Balkan Bazaar is an Albanian film directed by Edmond Budina. The film describes how Albanian graves were opened by Greeks and the contents moved and re-identified as being the bones of Greek soldiers from World War II.

References

External links
 

2011 films
Albanian comedy films
Albanian-language films